Exuperantius of Cingoli (sometimes ) was a 5th-century bishop of Cingoli,, in the Marche region of Italy. He is recognised as a saint in the Catholic and Eastern Orthodox Churches. Tradition attributes numerous miracles to his intercession both during his life and after his death, including the cessation of an outbreak of plague. Little is known about him with certainty, although he may have come from Africa.

He is the patron saint of the town where he was bishop, with Cingoli's records declaring in 1307 that Exuperantius is the "head and guide of the people of Cingoli". He is also the patron saint of Montefelcino, another , also in the Marche.

His feast day is 24 January. His characteristic symbols for artistic portrayal are the banner and book.

References

5th-century Italian bishops
Italian Roman Catholic saints
People from the Province of Macerata